Kevin Bracy-Davis (born January 23, 1995) is an American professional basketball player for the Ura of the Korisliiga. Standing at 2.01 m (6'7"), he plays the Small forward and the Shooting guard positions. After playing four years of college basketball at Davis & Elkins College, Bracy-Davis entered the 2017 NBA draft, but he was not selected in the draft's two rounds.

High school career
Bracy-Davis played high school basketball at Western Hills High School in Cincinnati, Ohio. He averaged 18 points, 11 rebounds, four assists, three blocks and 1.5 steals and he earned first team all-league selection as a senior.

College career
As a freshman at Davis & Elkins College, he played in all 30 games with 12 starts, averaging 8.0 points per game. During the following seasons, his numbers were increased and he was named twice to the first-team all GMAC. As a senior, he was also named as the Player of the Year.

Professional career
After going undrafted in the 2017 NBA draft, Bracy-Davis joined Leones de Quilpué of the Chilean League. On October, he left Leones de Quilpué and joined CDP Ponferrada in Spain. On January, he joined Korihait of the Korisliiga.

On June 20, 2018, he joined Rethymno Cretan Kings of the Greek Basket League.

References

External links
RealGM.com Profile 
Davis and Elkins College Profile 
Eurobasket.com profile

1995 births
Living people
Basketball players from Cincinnati
American men's basketball players
Small forwards
Shooting guards
Saskatchewan Rattlers players